Billy Hanning Jr. (born April 18, 1985) was a member of the gold medal-winning US team in Para ice hockey at the 2018 Winter Paralympics. He is a defenseman. Hanning lost a limb due to cancer.

References

External links 
 
 

1985 births
Living people
American amputees
American sledge hockey players
Paralympic sledge hockey players of the United States
Paralympic gold medalists for the United States
Para ice hockey players at the 2018 Winter Paralympics
Medalists at the 2018 Winter Paralympics
Ice hockey people from St. Louis
Paralympic medalists in sledge hockey
21st-century American people